The 1940–1945 Military Combatant's Medal was a Belgian war medal established by royal decree on 19 December 1967 and awarded to all members of the Belgian Armed Forces who fought from the United Kingdom during the Second World War.

Award description
The 1940–1945 Military Combatant's Medal is a 38mm wide bronze Greek cross with semi-circular protrusions filling the gaps between the arms up to 3mm from the cross arms' ends.  The obverse bears the relief image of a "lion rampant" at the centre of the cross. The reverse bears a vertical broadsword bisecting the years "1940" and "1945" inscribed in relief.

The medal is suspended by a ring through a suspension loop from a 36mm wide silk moiré ribbon.  The colours of the ribbon are divided as follows from the left to the right edge: 6mm green, 2mm red, 3mm yellow, 2mm black, 1 cm yellow, 2mm black, 3mm yellow, 2mm red, 6mm green.

Notable recipients (partial list)
The individuals listed below were awarded the 1940–1945 Military Combatant's Medal:
Lieutenant General Roger Dewandre
Lieutenant General Ernest Engelen
Lieutenant General Sir Louis Teysen
Lieutenant General Constant Weyns
Police Lieutenant General August Van Wanzeele
Aviator Lieutenant General Armand Crekillie
Aviator Vice Admiral Sir André Schlim
Cavalry Major General Jules François Gaston Everaert
 François Ernest Samray

See also

 List of Orders, Decorations and Medals of the Kingdom of Belgium

References

Other sources
 Quinot H., 1950, Recueil illustré des décorations belges et congolaises, 4e Edition. (Hasselt)
 Cornet R., 1982, Recueil des dispositions légales et réglementaires régissant les ordres nationaux belges. 2e Ed. N.pl.,  (Brussels)
 Borné A.C., 1985, Distinctions honorifiques de la Belgique, 1830–1985 (Brussels)

External links
Bibliothèque royale de Belgique (In French)
Les Ordres Nationaux Belges (In French)
ARS MORIENDI Notables from Belgian history (In French and Dutch)

Armed Resistance 1940-1945, Medal of the
Military awards and decorations of Belgium
Awards established in 1967